The Endymion class was a class of six Royal Navy 40-gun fifth-rate frigates, with the prototype launched in 1797 and five slightly amended versions built of fir launched from 1813 to 1814.

Design
In 1794, a frigate squadron under the command of Captain Sir John Borlase Warren captured the French 40-gun frigate . Surprisingly to her captors, the ship was armed with 26 × 24-pounder long guns, a main armament that was relatively uncommon for frigates in the 18th century.

On 30 April 1795, the Admiralty ordered three frigates – with 36 guns, 38 guns and 40 guns – the first and third built to the lines of the captured French frigate and the second to a new design by the Surveyors (the ship designers of the Royal Navy). She was launched on 29 March 1797 and towed to Deptford Dockyard, where she was commissioned in April 1797 and completed on 12 June 1797.

Endymion was not an exact copy of Pomone, being built to British design standards with stronger construction. Surprisingly, Endymion sailed even better than Pomone, reaching , the highest recorded speed during the Age of Sail. Reclassified as a 48-gun fourth-rate frigate in February 1817, then as 50-gun, and finally as 44-gun in February 1839, Endymions fine qualities were such that she continued to be praised for nearly half a century. She was finally broken up at Plymouth Dockyard in June 1868.

1812 Programme
Early in 1812, war with the United States seemed inevitable. To cope with the heavy American 24-pounder frigates of the Constitution-type, the Admiralty decided to build a batch of new 24-pounder frigates. During the long war with France, the standard British frigate was of about 1,000 tons and armed with a main battery of only 18-pounders, no match for the big US ships. The only proven design for a suitable 24-pounder frigate was that of Endymion, and in May 1812 two ships were ordered from Wigram, Wells & Green of Blackwall Yard, who were to construct all five ships eventually built. They differed from the prototype by being constructed of "fir" (actually, pitch pine) rather than oak, and mounted an extra (fourteenth) pair of 24-pounder guns on the upper deck forward. All would be reclassified as 50-gun fourth-rate frigates in February 1817; however, the use of softwood in their construction was such that they were only intended for a short lifetime, and indeed all five were taken to pieces after a few years' service.

These five new ships were of a slightly modified design, having ports for 28 instead of 26 × 24-pounders and were built of softwood, to speed up the construction. The ships were launched from June 1813 to February 1814.

Principal characteristics
There were small variations in the dimensions of the different ships:
 Length on gundeck:  159 feet 2 inches
 Beam: 41 feet 11 inches
 Tonnage: 1246 to 1277 tons
 Established armament: 28 (Endymion 26) × 24-pounders, 20 × 32-pounder carronades, 2 × 9-pounder chase guns
 Complement: 340 men
 Rated: 40-gun fifth-rates, rerated as 50-gun fourth-rates in 1817.

List of ships

Frigate classes
Fifth-rate frigates of the Royal Navy
Ship classes of the Royal Navy